La Roux is the debut studio album by English synth-pop duo La Roux, released on 26 June 2009 by Polydor Records. The album peaked at number two on the UK Albums Chart and was certified platinum by the British Phonographic Industry (BPI). It includes the singles "In for the Kill" and "Bulletproof", which reached numbers two and one on the UK Singles Chart, respectively.

The album was nominated for the 2009 Mercury Prize, and won the Grammy Award for Best Electronic/Dance Album at the 2011 ceremony. A 10-track Gold Edition of the album was released digitally in the United States on 8 February 2011, including the Kanye West-assisted version of "In for the Kill".

Singles
"Quicksand" was released as the album's lead single on 15 December 2008, originally reaching number 153 on the UK Singles Chart. The song was re-released on 23 November 2009 and rose to a new peak position of number 129 on the UK chart.

"In for the Kill" was released as the album's second single on 16 March 2009. The song peaked at number two on the UK Singles Chart for four consecutive weeks, while reaching the top 15 in Ireland and Norway, the top 40 in Australia and the top 50 in Belgium.

"Bulletproof" was released as the album's third single on 22 June 2009. The single debuted at number one on the UK Singles Chart, becoming La Roux's first chart-topper. The track reached number three in Austria, number five in Australia, Belgium and Ireland, number seven in New Zealand and number 13 in Germany. "Bulletproof" also became the duo's first entry on the Billboard Hot 100 in the United States, peaking at number eight.

"I'm Not Your Toy" was released as the album's fourth and final single on 28 September 2009. Speaking to The Guardian on 22 July 2009, Jackson explained that the duo chose to release the single in the summer because she "think[s] sunny weather drives you towards certain tempos and melodies that work well booming out of open windows", adding that the song "has a brightness that wouldn't work in winter." It peaked at number 27 on the UK Singles Chart.

On 15 July 2010, Jackson uploaded a behind-the-scenes preview of the music video for "Tigerlily" on YouTube discussing its theme. However, neither the single nor the video ever materialised.

Critical reception

La Roux received generally positive reviews from music critics. At Metacritic, which assigns a normalised rating out of 100 to reviews from mainstream publications, the album received an average score of 76, based on 16 reviews. Luke Turner of NME raved that "with this astounding debut, an unassuming 21-year-old from SW2 has revitalised a forgotten form to make one of the finest forward-thinking British pop albums of recent memory." Steve Harris of Clash viewed the album as "[t]he ultimate expression of '80s love" and stated that "apart from a couple of later tracks, the album is far from filler and still delivers blow after blow of superb songcraft." Heather Phares of AllMusic opined that "La Roux's dedication to their aesthetic makes this an album where the songs are variations on a theme, and on the rare occasion where the songwriting isn't razor-sharp, the style threatens to overtake the substance. However, that devotion also makes La Roux a standout, not just among the many other '80s revivalists, but the entire late-2000s pop landscape." Rolling Stones Rob Sheffield commented, "Along with co-writer and fellow synth dude Ben Langmaid, [Elly Jackson is] ruling U.K. radio with splashy dance hits about sex and betrayal", highlighting "Bulletproof" as the album's "definitive gem".

Talia Kraines of BBC Music wrote, "That shrill vocal might mean the [...] album is not something you're likely to listen to all in one go in a high pressure situation, but it's one jam-packed with killer pop song after killer pop song." Slant Magazine reviewer Paul Schrodt described La Roux's sound as "frosty, uniquely British, deliberately affected, and anything but casual", but felt that "it's the band's attempts at vulnerability ('Cover My Eyes') that make for the most insipid listens." Pitchforks Joshua Love noted that "La Roux delivers icy but irresistible throwback pop that hearkens back explicitly to fellow femme-led Brits Yazoo and the Eurythmics." The Guardians Alexis Petridis wrote, "The sound is authentically tinny, bass being something that most synthpop pioneers seemed to think the gleaming 'Music of the Future' could do without. The rhythms tend to a clipped, funkless boom-crash that listeners of a certain vintage may find difficult to hear without picturing a school disco dancefloor packed with fourth-formers trying to 'do' robotics." Peter Paphides of The Times expressed, "For the almost militant purity of its execution though, La Roux inspires a peculiar sort of awe. Exclusively using keyboards is one thing, but the Brixton-based duo have gone a step further, purging their sound of any keyboard noise that bears even a passing resemblance to what your Jeremy Clarkson sort of music fan would refer to as a 'real' instrument." Simon Price was critical of the album in his review for The Independent, stating that "[m]uch of the time, La Roux sound strangely distorted, like the backing music from an early 1990s Sega Mega Drive game turned up to 11."

Accolades
La Roux was shortlisted for the 2009 Mercury Prize. On 13 February 2011, the album won Best Electronic/Dance Album at the 53rd Annual Grammy Awards.

Commercial performance
La Roux debuted at number two on the UK Albums Chart with 62,650 copies sold in its first week, becoming the third fastest-selling debut album of 2009 in the United Kingdom after Susan Boyle's I Dreamed a Dream and Florence and the Machine's Lungs, respectively. The album was certified platinum by the British Phonographic Industry (BPI) on 12 February 2010, and by July 2014, it had sold 416,667 copies in the UK. As of May 2014, La Roux had sold over two million copies worldwide.

Track listing

Gold Edition

Personnel
Credits adapted from the liner notes of La Roux.

Musicians
 Elly Jackson – vocals
 London Community Gospel Choir – backing vocals 
 Kit Jackson – spoken word (uncredited)

Technical
 Ben Langmaid – production
 Elly Jackson – production
 Ben Hirst – production 
 Serban Ghenea – mixing 
 John Hanes – mix engineering 
 Tim Roberts – mix engineering assistance 
 Dan Carey – mixing 
 Ian Sherwin – engineering

Artwork
 Andy Whitton – photography
 Alexander Brown – photography, art direction, design
 Traffic – art direction, design
 Hannah Neaves – art direction, design

Charts

Weekly charts

Year-end charts

Decade-end charts

Certifications and sales

Release history

Notes

References

2009 debut albums
Albums recorded at RAK Studios
Cherrytree Records albums
Grammy Award for Best Dance/Electronica Album
Interscope Geffen A&M Records albums
Interscope Records albums
La Roux albums
Polydor Records albums